The Cửa Lớn River is a river of Vietnam.

The river flows through Cà Mau Province for 58 kilometres.

References

Rivers of Cà Mau province
Rivers of Vietnam